The Peoria Explorers were a professional baseball team  in the United States founded in 2012. The team was based in Peoria, Arizona and a member of the independent Freedom Pro Baseball League, which is not affiliated with Minor League Baseball. They played their home games at Peoria Sports Complex.

2013 roster

References

External links 
 Peoria Explorers

Freedom Pro Baseball League teams
Baseball teams established in 2012
Professional baseball teams in Arizona
Defunct independent baseball league teams
Defunct baseball teams in Arizona
Baseball teams disestablished in 2013